The Music Building and Recital Hall (MRH) is a building on the University of Texas at Austin campus, in the U.S. state of Texas. The building was completed in 1969.

Bates Recital Hall, which seats 700, is housed in the Music Recital Hall.

The Longhorn Band hall is located in side MRH.

References

1969 establishments in Texas
University and college buildings completed in 1969
University of Texas at Austin campus